Conospermum cinereum is a shrub endemic to Western Australia.

It blooms between September and December producing white flowers.

It is found on sand plain areas in the southern Wheatbelt,  and Great Southern regions of Western Australia where it grows in sandy soils.

References

External links

Eudicots of Western Australia
cinereum
Endemic flora of Western Australia
Plants described in 1995